Usher Glacier is a glacier nearly 4 nautical miles (7 km) long, flowing northwest 
into the sea between Stigant Point and Davey Point on the north coast of King George Island, in the South Shetland Islands. Named by the United Kingdom Antarctic Place-Names Committee (UK-APC) in 1960 for J. Usher, Master of the Caraquet from Liverpool, who visited the South Shetland Islands in 1821–22.

See also
 List of glaciers in the Antarctic
 Glaciology

References
 

Glaciers of King George Island (South Shetland Islands)